Science and Health with Key to the Scriptures is, along with the Bible, the central text of the Christian Science religion. Mary Baker Eddy described it as her "most important work." She began writing it in February 1872 and the first edition was published in 1875. However, she would continue working on it and making changes for the rest of her life.

The book was selected as one of the "75 Books By Women Whose Words Have Changed The World," by the Women's National Book Association.

As of 2001, the book had sold over nine million copies.

Basic beliefs
Christian Science develops its theology and its healing method from these simple statements:

"God is All-in all." 
"God is good." 
"God is Mind, and God is infinite; hence all is Mind."

Structure
The latest edition of the book consists of a short preface, the main section, a "Key to the Scriptures", and Fruitage. Some editions include a word index.

Main section

The main section is 500 pages long and comprises chapters titled as follows:

 Prayer
 Atonement and Eucharist
 Marriage
 Christian Science versus Spiritualism
 Animal Magnetism Unmasked
 Science, Theology, Medicine
 Physiology
 Footsteps of Truth
 Creation
 Science of Being
 Some Objections Answered
 Christian Science Practice (which explains how healing is undertaken)
 Teaching Christian Science
 Recapitulation (the text used for class instruction in Christian Science healing).

Key to the Scriptures 
This section is 100 pages long, and comprises
 Genesis (a detailed analysis of the two versions of the creation story given in Genesis)
 The Apocalypse (an analysis of parts of Revelation)
 Glossary (giving the spiritual meaning of 114 Biblical terms)

Fruitage 
This 100-page-long section consists of 84 testimonials of the healing power derived from reading the text in Science and Health.  There are descriptions of addiction, asthma, broken bone, cataract, cancer, deafness, eczema, a fibroid tumor, and rheumatism. Prior intervention by physicians is mentioned in 50 of these cases, and one relates a confirmatory X-ray by a physician.

Copyright
The first edition was copyrighted in 1875. The copyright for Science and Health went through several renewals including a posthumous renewal in 1934 by the Christian Science Board of Directors.
At the request of the Christian Science Board of Directors, in December 1971 Congress passed a law extending the copyright on Science and Health by 75 years.

However, following a legal suit brought by David James Nolan and Lucile J. Place of United Christian Scientists, the copyright extension was found unconstitutional in 1985 by Federal District Judge Thomas Penfield Jackson. In 1987 the United States Court of Appeals for the District of Columbia upheld the ruling of the district court. As a result, Science and Health has been in the public domain since 1987.

Editions

The first edition was printed by W. F. Brown & Co. Their invoice for 1,000 copies, dated 30 October 1875, was made out to George M. Barry and Edward Hitchins for $2285.35. It consisted of 456 pages, plus 2 pages of errata. Unfortunately there were hundreds of typographic errors, some because the printer, not understanding the author's meaning, had tried to correct the wording without consulting her. The second edition, printed by Rand, Avery & Co, appeared in 1878, with 167 pages of new material. It was called Science and Health Volume 2 to indicate that it was a supplement to the first edition, but it, too, was full of typographic errors. However the third edition, printed by John Wilson at the University Press in Cambridge, Massachusetts, was of a high standard. Twelve further two-volume editions followed, before the 16th edition appeared as a single volume in 1886. This edition of the book had 552 pages, plus an index of 38 pages, and "with Key to the Scriptures" had been added to the title. Eddy remained loyal to the University Press for the rest of her life, and in 1897 even made a substantial investment to save it from bankruptcy.

Eddy closed her college and left Boston in 1889, in order to revise the text for the 50th edition (1891). This  consisted of 578 pages plus a 73-page index, and for the first time included marginal headings. The 226th "thousand" (edition) appeared in 1902, and this included "Fruitage," making up the page count of 700 pages which remains to this day. The last numbered edition was the 418th, which appeared in 1906, but further changes were made until 1910. According to the Mary Baker Eddy Library, major editions include those printed in 1875, 1878, 1881, 1883, 1886, 1891, 1902, and 1907.

Summary
Science and Health encapsulates the teachings of Christian Science and Christian Scientists often call it their "textbook." At Sunday services, passages from the book are read along with passages from the Bible. Eddy called the two books Christian Science's "dual and impersonal pastor."

References

Further reading

External links

 Read Science and Health with Key to the Scriptures online
  The major milestones of Science and Health with Key to the Scriptures from the Mary Baker Eddy Library website
 Science and Health (First edition. Boston: Christian Scientist Publishing Company, 1875) from the National Library of Medicine

1875 non-fiction books
Works by Mary Baker Eddy
1875 in religion
19th-century Christian texts
Works subject to a lawsuit